Cruz 101 (better known simply as Cruz) is a nightclub and music venue situated in Manchester's Gay Village which is centred on Canal Street, England. It is one of the most popular and longest-running gay clubs in Greater Manchester, often boasting itself as "Manchester's Favourite Gay Venue".

Creation
Before it was turned into a night club, Cruz 101 was a shipping warehouse, which contributed to Manchester's huge textiles industry and making the area the world's largest marketplace for cotton goods. After some time being derelict, a renovation process began, lasting up to a year, after which point the club was ready to open its doors for the first time on 22 May 1992. Cruz shares the building with offices which occupy the floors above and a smaller club to the rear called Satans Hollow.

History
When Cruz first opened, the licensing laws at the time insisted that membership was compulsory and punters had to wait up to 48 hours for membership to be cleared. The club owners followed up a lengthy legal battle at the high court encouraged by increased pressure from customers meant that the club was allowed to offer membership on the door, therefore eliminating the need to have a pending period before membership can be authorised. Whilst initially this legality only entitled Cruz 101 to allow membership on the door, it ultimately set a precedent in allowing other night clubs in the United Kingdom to have this right. The new flexible membership options available at Cruz proved to be both a benefit and somewhat of a hindrance to the club owners and its regular clientele. Before the court battle, the club found itself restricted by license conditions that other clubs need not meet; however, it was the strict membership policy which made customers feel the club was one of the few true safe gay venues in the area. During the 1990s, the club was owned by Foo Foo Lammar.

In 1999 the exterior lighting and signage of the club was changed from "Cruz 101" to Babylon as a backdrop for scenes of the UK series of Queer As Folk. Following the completion of filming, the original name and signage was returned.

In 2002, Cruz won the right to admit non-members, giving it the opportunity to raise revenue by admitting almost anyone. The club, however, has a door policy which remains predominantly gay. Cruz still operates a membership scheme which allows for a slightly reduced entrance fee for membership card holders.

Present
Today the club remains extremely popular among older and younger party-goers alike. It has evolved from opening just two nights a week to the present four nights a week; Cruz opened its doors on a Sunday on a permanent basis for the first time in 2006.
Cruz often works in partnership with other bars, events and clubs in and around Manchester's Gay Village, creating events and raising funds for lesbian and gay charities, one of the most popular being Back2Back. Cruz used to compete with Essential, a nightclub also located in the gay village owned by former Take That manager Nigel Martin-Smith, which has now shut down. On 28 May 2011, Cruz celebrated its 19th birthday with a capacity crowd and a personal appearance by musical theatre star Kerry Ellis.

Cruz 101 has had many famous singers, performers and PAs over the years, including Sonia, The Weather Girls, Phil Oakey, Heaven 17, Hazell Dean, Margarita Pracatan, Take That and The Nolans, among others. More recently, the club has opened its doors to Kelly Llorenna, Angie Brown, Scooch, Steps, Graham Norton and Lily Savage. On 24 May 2008, Booty Luv performed live on stage at the 16th birthday of Cruz 101, singing four of their songs.

Cruz has two floors, with the 'main floor' (on which the entrance to the club is located) being the busiest. This is where Cruz concentrates its efforts, with PAs taking place on this floor as well as themed events, for example, at Christmas, New Year, Halloween etc. The main floor also features more disco lights and bars. Alternatively, Cruz features a slightly smaller downstairs known as 'Sub 101', which is accessible from the main club; however on some occasions Cruz charges an entrance fee from alternative outside entrance on special promoted nights. Sub is predominantly reserved for Trance and Bouncy House. Sub has just one alcohol-serving bar as opposed to the main floor which has two. Sub 101 is open every Saturday and events, it’s always posted on Facebook page before so customers can know before if this area is gonna be open that night. 

The longest-running weekly event at Cruz is Disco Inferno on a Monday night which started in 1993. Originally featuring disco from the 1970s and 80s, the music policy has been expanded to include the 90s and now, and each week has a 'featured artist' from pop history.

A resident DJ at Cruz, Almighty Donald, takes his name from the namesake Almighty Records as he often plays and mixes music produced by the company.

Cruz is owned by three people equally, one of whom owns Napoleons, a bar club also located in the gay village. The general manager of Cruz is currently Gerrard Woods and the assistant manager is Paul Tuck. John Cooper is the bar manager, who also plays the resident drag queen known as 'Miss Cara' where at weekends, announces the DJ and welcomes any special guest PAs that may be taking place. Ben Ramsden serves as promotion manager, having taking over in 2015.

Incidents

During Gay Pride 2008, one phase of the power failed in the club leaving limited disco lighting in operation and no music playing for about 20 minutes. Staff at the club managed to bring most of the power back on-line, however several sets of disco lights and bar lights were non-functional on one of the clubs busiest nights of the year. The power failure was caused by a failure of the main supply to the building.

On New Year's Eve 2008, a small fire broke out on stage shortly after midnight which was caused by a mis-firing show pyrotechnic. Staff evacuated the club and police attended. No injuries were reported and around 20 minutes later the large group of party-goers which waited outside the main entrance were allowed back in. The club remained open well into the early hours with the capacity crowd partying until well after 7am.

DJs
Cruz has many resident DJs on rotation, all playing varying types of dance music, but only two of them play regularly in Sub. Cruz rarely invites non-resident DJs to play at the club.

 Almighty Donald - Hi-NRG, Commercial Dance.
 Rob James - Trance in 'Sub' and Commercial Dance on the main floor.
 DJ Spook - Hi-NRG, Commercial Dance.
 Flash Tony - Commercial Dance and Bouncy house.
 Darren Leasley - Commercial Dance.
 Little Miss Natalie - Trance and Bouncy house in 'Sub'.
 Dino - Hi-NRG, Inferno (70s, 80s, 90s and Now).

See also
 Manchester's Gay Village
 Queer As Folk
 Almighty Records

References

External links
 Cruz 101 - Official website
 Real Manchester - Photos from the club

Nightclubs in Manchester
Music venues in Manchester
History of Manchester
LGBT culture in Manchester
LGBT nightclubs in England